The 2008 Cork Premier Intermediate Hurling Championship was the fifth staging of the Cork Premier Intermediate Hurling Championship since its establishment by the Cork County Board in 2004. The championship began on 3 May 2008 and ended on 19 October 2008.

On 20 July 2008, Aghada were relegated from the championship following a 1-17 to 2-7 defeat by Argideen Rangers.

On 19 October 2008, Blarney won the championship following a 0-13 to 1-9 defeat of Courcey Rovers in the final. This was their first championship title in the grade.

Ger O'Leary from the Fr. O'Neill's club was the championship's top scorer with 2-38.

Teams

A total of 16 teams contested the Premier Intermediate Championship, including 14 teams from the 2007 premier intermediate championship, one relegated from the 2007 senior championship and one promoted from the 2007 intermediate championship.

Results

Round 1

Round 2

Relegation play-offs

Round 3

Quarter-finals

Semi-finals

Final

Championship statistics

Top scorers

Top scorer overall

Top scorers in a single game

Miscellaneous

 By gaining promotion, Blarney return to the Cork Senior Hurling Championship after a hiatus of nearly 70 years.
 Blarney their first Premier Intermediate title.

References

External links
 2008 Cork PIHC results

Cork Premier Intermediate Hurling Championship
Cork Premier Intermediate Hurling Championship